Menhdawal is a town and a nagar panchayat in Sant Kabir Nagar district in the Indian state of Uttar Pradesh.

Demographics
As of 2011 India census Mehndawal had a population of 27,897. Males constituted 14,390 of the population and females 13,507. Mehndawal has an average literacy rate of 66.84% lower than state average of 67.68%. Male literacy is 75.04% and female literacy is 58.17%. In Mehndawal 16.26% of the population is under 6 years of age.

References

Cities and towns in Sant Kabir Nagar district